Neel Trimarans is a manufacturer of trimarans based in La Rochelle, France.

The company was founded and is managed by Eric Bruneel, formerly of Fountaine-Pajot, a large and established manufacturer in the same area with a catamaran focus.

Models
 Neel 45
 Neel 47
 Neel 65

References

External links
Neel Trimarans

French boat builders